The Laws of Jazz is the debut album by jazz flautist Hubert Laws released on the Atlantic label in 1964.

Reception
The Allmusic review by Scott Yanow awarded the album 4 stars stating "Laws is in fine form during what is essentially a straight-ahead jazz set. Some of the music is a little funky, but throughout, Laws (who plays piccolo on two of the seven numbers) is in excellent form".

Track listing
All compositions by Hubert Laws except as indicated
 "Miss Thing" (Bobby Thomas) - 3:47
 "All Soul" (Curtis Lewis) - 3:39
 "Black Eyed Peas and Rice" - 3:25
 "Bessie's Blues" - 6:12
 "And Don't You Forget It" (Thomas) - 2:59
 "Bimbe Blue" - 7:51
 "Capers" (Tommy McIntosh) - 5:36
Recorded in New York City on April 2, 1964 (tracks 1, 3 & 6) and April 22, 1964 (tracks 2, 4, 5 & 7)

Personnel
Hubert Laws - flute, piccolo
Armando (Chick) Corea - piano 
Richard Davis - bass
Jimmy Cobb (tracks 2, 4, 5 & 7), Bobby Thomas (tracks 1, 3 & 6) - drums

References

 

1964 albums
Atlantic Records albums
Hubert Laws albums
Albums produced by Joel Dorn